Harold William Kuhn (July 29, 1925 – July 2, 2014) was an American mathematician who studied game theory.  He won the 1980 John von Neumann Theory Prize along with David Gale and Albert W. Tucker.  A former Professor Emeritus of Mathematics at Princeton University, he is known for the Karush–Kuhn–Tucker conditions, for Kuhn's theorem, for developing Kuhn poker as well as the description of the Hungarian method for the assignment problem. Recently, though, a paper by Carl Gustav Jacobi, published posthumously in 1890 in Latin, has been discovered that anticipates by many decades the Hungarian algorithm.

Life 
Kuhn was born in Santa Monica in 1925. He is known for his association with John Forbes Nash, as a fellow graduate student, a lifelong friend and colleague, and a key figure in getting Nash the attention of the Nobel Prize committee that led to Nash's 1994 Nobel Prize in Economics. Kuhn and Nash both had long associations and collaborations with Albert W. Tucker, who was Nash's dissertation advisor. Kuhn co-edited The Essential John Nash, and is credited as the mathematics consultant in the 2001 movie adaptation of Nash's life, A Beautiful Mind.

Harold Kuhn served as the third president of the Society for Industrial and Applied Mathematics (SIAM). He was elected to the 2002 class of Fellows of the Institute for Operations Research and the Management Sciences.

In 1949, he married Estelle Henkin, sister of logician Leon Henkin. His oldest son was oral historian Clifford Kuhn (1952-2015), an associate professor at Georgia State University noted for his scholarship on the American South. Another son, Nicholas Kuhn, is a professor of mathematics at the University of Virginia.  His youngest son, Jonathan Kuhn, is Director of Art and Antiquities for the New York City Department of Parks & Recreation.

Kuhn died on July 2, 2014.

Bibliography 
 

 Owen, Guillermo. (2004) "IFORS' Operational Research Hall of Fame Harold W. Kuhn" International Transactions in Operational Research 11 (6), 715–718. .
 Kuhn, H.W. Classics in Game Theory. (Princeton University Press, 1997). .
 Kuhn, H.W. Linear Inequalities and Related Systems (AM-38)  (Princeton University Press, 1956).  .
 Kuhn, H.W. Contributions to the Theory of Games, I (AM-24). (Princeton University Press, 1950).  .
 Kuhn, H.W. Contributions to the Theory of Games, II (AM-28)  (Princeton University Press, 1953).  .
 Kuhn, H.W. Lectures on the Theory of Games. (Princeton University Press, 2003).  .
 Kuhn, H.W. and Nasar, Sylvia, editors.  The Essential John Nash. (Princeton University Press, 2001). .

References

External links 
 
 Princeton University Press:  The Essential John Nash
 Collaboration with George Dantzig
 biography of Harold Kuhn from the Institute for Operations Research and the Management Sciences

20th-century American mathematicians
1925 births
Game theorists
Princeton University faculty
John von Neumann Theory Prize winners
Fellows of the Econometric Society
2014 deaths
Fellows of the Institute for Operations Research and the Management Sciences
Fellows of the Society for Industrial and Applied Mathematics
Presidents of the Society for Industrial and Applied Mathematics
Fair division researchers